The following is an outline of 1987 in spaceflight.

Launches

|}

Deep-space rendezvous
There were no deep-space rendezvous in 1987.

References

Footnotes

 
Spaceflight by year